Marcel Lička (born 17 July 1977) is a Czech football coach and former player. He works currently as a manager of FC Orenburg in Russian Premier League.

Playing career
He made over 171 appearances in the Czech First League and 37 appearances in Polish League. Lička played international football at under-21 level for Czech Republic U21. He is the son of footballer Werner Lička.

Coaching career
On 28 May 2022, under Lička's management, FC Orenburg was promoted into the Russian Premier League.

References

External links

1977 births
Living people
Sportspeople from Ostrava
Czech footballers
Association football midfielders
Czech Republic under-21 international footballers
Czech First League players
Czech expatriate footballers
Ekstraklasa players
Expatriate footballers in Poland
Expatriate footballers in Spain
Expatriate footballers in France
FC Baník Ostrava players
SK Slavia Prague players
FK Chmel Blšany players
FK Viktoria Žižkov players
FC Fastav Zlín players
Górnik Zabrze players
Dyskobolia Grodzisk Wielkopolski players
UD Horadada players
Calais RUFC players
SK Kladno players
Czech football managers
Czech expatriate football managers
Expatriate football managers in Belarus
FK Chmel Blšany managers
FC Dynamo Brest managers
FC Orenburg managers
Expatriate football managers in Russia
Russian Premier League managers
Czech expatriate sportspeople in Russia
Czech expatriate sportspeople in Belarus